The 2022 Minas Gerais state elections took place in the state of Minas Gerais, Brazil on 2 October 2022. Voters elected a governor, vice governor, one senator, 53 representatives for the Chamber of Deputies, and 77 Legislative Assembly members. The incumbent governor, Romeu Zema, a member of the New Party, was eligible for a second term, and intended to run for reelection.

For the election to the Federal Senate, the seat occupied by Alexandre Silveira, from the Social Democratic Party (PSD), was at dispute. Silveira took office in February 2022 with the resignation of the incumbent elected in 2014, Antônio Anastasia (PSDB). Anastasia took office as a Justice of the Federal Court of Accounts of Brazil (TCU).

Electoral calendar

Gubernatorial election 
Political parties have until August 15, 2022 to formally register their candidates.

Potential candidates

Withdrawn candidates 

 Saraiva Felipe (PSB) - Federal deputy for Minas Gerais (1995–2019) and Minister of Health of Brazil (2005–2006). His political party, the Brazilian Socialist Party (PSB) withdrew the former minister's candidacy for the state government to support Alexandre Kalil.

Senatorial election 
Political parties have until August 15, 2022 to formally register their candidates.

Potential candidates

Legislative Assembly 
The result of the last state election and the current situation in the Legislative Assembly of Minas Gerais is given below:

Opinion polling

Governor

First round 
The first round is scheduled to take place on 2 October 2022.

Second round 
The second round (if necessary) is scheduled to take place on 30 October 2022.

Zema vs. Kalil

Zema vs. Viana

Kalil vs. Viana
Zema vs. Medioli

Zema vs. Pacheco

Senator

Results

Governor

Senator

Notes

References

2022 Brazilian gubernatorial elections
Minas Gerais gubernatorial elections
2022 elections in Brazil